The 1979 Houston Astros season was a season in American baseball. The team finished second in the National League West, 1½ games behind the first-place Cincinnati Reds. The 1979 Astros were the last National League franchise in the 20th century to hit more triples than home runs. The club had 52 triples compared to 49 home runs.

Offseason 
 December 8, 1978: Floyd Bannister was traded by the Astros to the Seattle Mariners for Craig Reynolds.

Regular season

Season standings

Record vs. opponents

Notable transactions 
 April 27, 1979: The Astros traded a player to be named later to the Kansas City Royals for George Throop. The Astros completed the deal by sending Keith Drumright to the Royals on October 26.
 June 13, 1979: Bob Watson was traded by the Astros to the Boston Red Sox for Pete Ladd, a player to be named later, and cash. The Red Sox completed the deal by sending Bobby Sprowl to the Astros on June 19.

Draft picks 
 June 5, 1979: 1979 Major League Baseball draft
 John Mizerock was drafted by the Houston Astros in the 1st round (8th pick). 
 Bill Doran was drafted by the Astros in the 6th round.
 Mark Ross was drafted by the Astros in the 7th round.
 Lemmie Miller was drafted by the Astros in the 1st round (20th pick) of the secondary phase, but did not sign.

Roster

Game log 

|- style="text-align:center; background:#cfc
| 1 || April 6 || Braves || || || || || || 1–0 || W1
|- style="text-align:center; background:#cfc
| 2 || April 7 || Braves || || || || || || 2–0 || W2
|- style="text-align:center; background:#cfc
| 3 || April 8 || Braves || || || || || || 3–0 || W3
|- style="text-align:center; background:#fbb
| 4 || April 9 || Dodgers || || || || || || 3–1 || L1
|- style="text-align:center; background:#cfc
| 5 || April 10 || Dodgers || || || || || || 4–1 || W1
|- style="text-align:center; background:#cfc
| 6 || April 11 || Dodgers || || || || || || 5–1 || W2
|- style="text-align:center; background:#fbb
| 7 || April 13 || @ Giants || || || || || || 5–2 || L1
|- style="text-align:center; background:#fbb
| 8 || April 14 || @ Giants || || || || || || 5–3 || L2
|- style="text-align:center; background:#cfc
| 9 || April 15 || @ Giants || || || || || || 6–3 || W1
|- style="text-align:center; background:#cfc
| 10 || April 15 || @ Giants || || || || || || 7–3 || W2
|- style="text-align:center; background:#cfc
| 11 || April 16 || @ Dodgers || || || || || || 8–3 || W3
|- style="text-align:center; background:#fbb
| 12 || April 17 || @ Dodgers || || || || || || 8–4 || L1
|- style="text-align:center; background:#cfc
| 13 || April 18 || @ Dodgers || || || || || || 9–4 || W1
|- style="text-align:center; background:#cfc
| 14 || April 20 || Pirates || 5–4 (10) || || || || 19,834 || 10–4 || W2
|- style="text-align:center; background:#cfc
| 15 || April 21 || Pirates || 5–4 (10) || || || || 48,977 || 11–4 || W3
|- style="text-align:center; background:#cfc
| 16 || April 22 || Pirates || 3–2 || || || || 22,403 || 12–4 || W4
|- style="text-align:center; background:#bbb;"
| — || April 24 || @ Cubs || colspan="7" |Postponed (rain). Makeup date: July 7.
|- style="text-align:center; background:#fbb
| 17 || April 25 || @ Cubs || || || || || || 12–5 || L1
|- style="text-align:center; background:#cfc
| 18 || April 26 || @ Cubs || || || || || || 13–5 || W1
|- style="text-align:center; background:#cfc
| 19 || April 27 || @ Pirates || 9–8 (11) || || || || 5,767 || 14–5 || W2
|- style="text-align:center; background:#bbb;"
| — || April 28 || @ Pirates || colspan="7" |Postponed (rain). Makeup date: July 19.
|- style="text-align:center; background:#fbb
| 20 || April 29 || @ Pirates || 5–10 || || || || 7,598 || 14–6 || L1
|- style="text-align:center; background:#cfc
| 21 || April 30 || @ Cardinals || || || || || || 15–6 || W1
|-

|- style="text-align:center; background:#fbb
| 22 || May 1 || @ Cardinals || || || || || || 15–7 || L1
|- style="text-align:center; background:#fbb
| 23 || May 2 || @ Cardinals || || || || || || 15–8 || L2
|- style="text-align:center; background:#cfc
| 24 || May 3 || @ Cardinals || || || || || || 16–8 || W1
|- style="text-align:center; background:#fbb
| 25 || May 4 || @ Reds || || || || || || 16–9 || L1
|- style="text-align:center; background:#fbb
| 26 || May 5 || @ Reds || || || || || || 16–10 || L2
|- style="text-align:center; background:#fbb
| 27 || May 6 || @ Reds || || || || || || 16–11 || L3
|- style="text-align:center; background:#cfc
| 28 || May 6 || @ Reds || || || || || || 17–11 || W1
|- style="text-align:center; background:#fbb
| 29 || May 8 || Cardinals || || || || || || 17–12 || L1
|- style="text-align:center; background:#cfc
| 30 || May 9 || Cardinals || || || || || || 18–12 || W1
|- style="text-align:center; background:#fbb
| 31 || May 10 || Cardinals || || || || || || 18–13 || L1
|- style="text-align:center; background:#fbb
| 32 || May 11 || Cubs || || || || || || 18–14 || L2
|- style="text-align:center; background:#cfc
| 33 || May 12 || Cubs || || || || || || 19–14 || W1
|- style="text-align:center; background:#fbb
| 34 || May 12 || Cubs || || || || || || 19–15 || L1
|- style="text-align:center; background:#cfc
| 35 || May 13 || Cubs || || || || || || 20–15 || W1
|- style="text-align:center; background:#fbb
| 36 || May 15 || Giants || || || || || || 20–16 || L1
|- style="text-align:center; background:#fbb
| 37 || May 16 || Giants || || || || || || 20–17 || L2
|- style="text-align:center; background:#fbb
| 38 || May 17 || Giants || || || || || || 20–18 || L3
|- style="text-align:center; background:#cfc
| 39 || May 18 || Padres || || || || || || 21–18 || W1
|- style="text-align:center; background:#fbb
| 40 || May 19 || Padres || || || || || || 21–19 || L1
|- style="text-align:center; background:#cfc
| 41 || May 20 || Padres || || || || || || 22–19 || W1
|- style="text-align:center; background:#cfc
| 42 || May 20 || Padres || || || || || || 23–19 || W2
|- style="text-align:center; background:#fbb
| 43 || May 21 || @ Braves || || || || || || 23–20 || L1
|- style="text-align:center; background:#cfc
| 44 || May 22 || @ Braves || || || || || || 24–20 || W1
|- style="text-align:center; background:#fbb
| 45 || May 23 || @ Braves || || || || || || 24–21 || L1
|- style="text-align:center; background:#fbb
| 46 || May 25 || @ Padres || || || || || || 24–22 || L2
|- style="text-align:center; background:#cfc
| 47 || May 26 || @ Padres || || || || || || 25–22 || W1
|- style="text-align:center; background:#cfc
| 48 || May 27 || @ Padres || || || || || || 26–22 || W2
|- style="text-align:center; background:#fbb
| 49 || May 28 || @ Padres || || || || || || 26–23 || L1
|- style="text-align:center; background:#cfc
| 50 || May 29 || Reds || || || || || || 27–23 || W1
|- style="text-align:center; background:#cfc
| 51 || May 30 || Reds || || || || || || 28–23 || W2
|- style="text-align:center; background:#cfc
| 52 || May 31 || Reds || || || || || || 29–23 || W3
|-

|- style="text-align:center; background:#cfc
| 53 || June 1 || Expos || || || || || || 30–23 || W4
|- style="text-align:center; background:#cfc
| 54 || June 2 || Expos || || || || || || 31–23 || W5
|- style="text-align:center; background:#cfc
| 55 || June 3 || Expos || || || || || || 32–23 || W6
|- style="text-align:center; background:#cfc
| 56 || June 4 || Phillies || || || || || || 33–23 || W7
|- style="text-align:center; background:#fbb
| 57 || June 5 || Phillies || || || || || || 33–24 || L1
|- style="text-align:center; background:#cfc
| 58 || June 6 || Phillies || || || || || || 34–24 || W1
|- style="text-align:center; background:#cfc
| 59 || June 8 || @ Mets || || || || || || 35–24 || W2
|- style="text-align:center; background:#fbb
| 60 || June 9 || @ Mets || || || || || || 35–25 || L1
|- style="text-align:center; background:#cfc
| 61 || June 10 || @ Mets || || || || || || 36–25 || W1
|- style="text-align:center; background:#fbb
| 62 || June 11 || @ Phillies || || || || || || 36–26 || L1
|- style="text-align:center; background:#fbb
| 63 || June 12 || @ Phillies || || || || || || 36–27 || L2
|- style="text-align:center; background:#cfc
| 64 || June 13 || @ Phillies || || || || || || 37–27 || W1
|- style="text-align:center; background:#cfc
| 65 || June 15 || @ Expos || || || || || || 38–27 || W2
|- style="text-align:center; background:#fbb
| 66 || June 16 || @ Expos || || || || || || 38–28 || L1
|- style="text-align:center; background:#fbb
| 67 || June 17 || @ Expos || || || || || || 38–29 || L2
|- style="text-align:center; background:#cfc
| 68 || June 18 || Mets || || || || || || 39–29 || W1
|- style="text-align:center; background:#cfc
| 69 || June 19 || Mets || || || || || || 40–29 || W2
|- style="text-align:center; background:#cfc
| 70 || June 20 || Mets || || || || || || 41–29 || W3
|- style="text-align:center; background:#cfc
| 71 || June 22 || Padres || || || || || || 42–29 || W4
|- style="text-align:center; background:#cfc
| 72 || June 23 || Padres || || || || || || 43–29 || W5
|- style="text-align:center; background:#cfc
| 73 || June 24 || Padres || || || || || || 44-29 || W6
|- style="text-align:center; background:#fbb
| 74 || June 25 || Reds || || || || || || 44–30 || L1
|- style="text-align:center; background:#cfc
| 75 || June 25 || Reds || || || || || || 45–30 || W1
|- style="text-align:center; background:#cfc
| 76 || June 26 || Reds || || || || || || 46–30 || W2
|- style="text-align:center; background:#fbb
| 77 || June 27 || @ Giants || || || || || || 46–31 || L1
|- style="text-align:center; background:#cfc
| 78 || June 28 || @ Giants || || || || || || 47–31 || W1
|- style="text-align:center; background:#cfc
| 79 || June 29 || @ Padres || || || || || || 48–31 || W2
|- style="text-align:center; background:#cfc
| 80 || June 30 || @ Padres || || || || || || 49–31 || W3
|-

|- style="text-align:center; background:#cfc
| 81 || July 1 || @ Padres || || || || || || 50–31 || W4
|- style="text-align:center; background:#cfc
| 82 || July 3 || @ Reds || || || || || || 51–31 || W5
|- style="text-align:center; background:#cfc
| 83 || July 4 || @ Reds || || || || || || 52–31 || W6
|- style="text-align:center; background:#fbb
| 84 || July 5 || @ Reds || || || || || || 52–32 || L1
|- style="text-align:center; background:#cfc
| 85 || July 6 || @ Cubs || || || || || || 53–32 || W1
|- style="text-align:center; background:#fbb
| 86 || July 7 || @ Cubs || || || || || || 53–33 || L1
|- style="text-align:center; background:#fbb
| 87 || July 7 || @ Cubs || || || || || || 53–34 || L2
|- style="text-align:center; background:#fbb
| 88 || July 8 || @ Cubs || || || || || || 53–35 || L3
|- style="text-align:center; background:#fbb
| 89 || July 10 || Pirates || 3–4 || || || || 31,341 || 53–36 || L4
|- style="text-align:center; background:#fbb
| 90 || July 11 || Pirates || 1–5 || || || || 25,330 || 53–37 || L5
|- style="text-align:center; background:#fbb
| 91 || July 12 || Pirates || 3–5 || || || || 22,956 || 53–38 || L6
|- style="text-align:center; background:#fbb
| 92 || July 13 || Cardinals || || || || || || 53–39 || L7
|- style="text-align:center; background:#cfc
| 93 || July 14 || Cardinals || || || || || || 54–39 || W1
|- style="text-align:center; background:#fbb
| 94 || July 15 || Cardinals || || || || || || 54–40 || L1
|- style="text-align:center; background:#bbcaff;"
| colspan="10" | 50th All-Star Game in Seattle, Washington
|- style="text-align:center; background:#fbb
| 95 || July 19 || @ Pirates || 5–9 || || || || || 54–41 || L2
|- style="text-align:center; background:#fbb
| 96 || July 19 || @ Pirates || 2–4 || || || || 33,464 || 54–42 || L3
|- style="text-align:center; background:#fbb
| 97 || July 20 || @ Pirates || 3–9 || || || || 23,585 || 54–43 || L4
|- style="text-align:center; background:#fbb
| 98 || July 21 || @ Pirates || 5–6 || || || || 19,570 || 54–44 || L5
|- style="text-align:center; background:#cfc
| 99 || July 22 || @ Cardinals || || || || || || 55–44 || W1
|- style="text-align:center; background:#cfc
| 100 || July 23 || @ Cardinals || || || || || || 56–44 || W2
|- style="text-align:center; background:#cfc
| 101 || July 24 || Cubs || || || || || || 57–44 || W3
|- style="text-align:center; background:#cfc
| 102 || July 25 || Cubs || || || || || || 58–44 || W4
|- style="text-align:center; background:#fbb
| 103 || July 26 || Dodgers || || || || || || 58–45 || L1
|- style="text-align:center; background:#fbb
| 104 || July 27 || Dodgers || || || || || || 58–46 || L2
|- style="text-align:center; background:#cfc
| 105 || July 28 || Dodgers || || || || || || 59–46 || W1
|- style="text-align:center; background:#cfc
| 106 || July 29 || Dodgers || || || || || || 60–46 || W2
|- style="text-align:center; background:#fbb
| 107 || July 30 || Giants || || || || || || 60–47 || L1
|- style="text-align:center; background:#cfc
| 108 || July 31 || Giants || || || || || || 61–47 || W1
|-

|- style="text-align:center; background:#cfc
| 109 || August 1 || Giants || || || || || || 62–47 || W2
|- style="text-align:center; background:#cfc
| 110 || August 3 || Braves || || || || || || 63–47 || W3
|- style="text-align:center; background:#cfc
| 111 || August 4 || Braves || || || || || || 64–47 || W4
|- style="text-align:center; background:#cfc
| 112 || August 4 || Braves || || || || || || 65–47 || W5
|- style="text-align:center; background:#cfc
| 113 || August 5 || Braves || || || || || || 66–47 || W6
|- style="text-align:center; background:#fbb
| 114 || August 7 || @ Dodgers || || || || || || 66–48 || L1
|- style="text-align:center; background:#cfc
| 115 || August 8 || @ Dodgers || || || || || || 67–48 || W1
|- style="text-align:center; background:#fbb
| 116 || August 9 || @ Dodgers || || || || || || 67–49 || L1
|- style="text-align:center; background:#cfc
| 117 || August 10 || @ Braves || || || || || || 68–49 || W1
|- style="text-align:center; background:#bbb;"
| — || August 11 || @ Braves || colspan="7" |Postponed (rain). Makeup date: September 24.
|- style="text-align:center; background:#fbb
| 118 || August 12 || @ Braves || || || || || || 68–50 || L1
|- style="text-align:center; background:#cfc
| 119 || August 13 || Expos || || || || || || 69–50 || W1
|- style="text-align:center; background:#cfc
| 120 || August 14 || Expos || || || || || || 70–50 || W2
|- style="text-align:center; background:#fbb
| 121 || August 15 || Expos || || || || || || 70–51 || L1
|- style="text-align:center; background:#fbb
| 122 || August 17 || Phillies || || || || || || 70–52 || L2
|- style="text-align:center; background:#fbb
| 123 || August 18 || Phillies || || || || || || 70–53 || L3
|- style="text-align:center; background:#fbb
| 124 || August 19 || Phillies || || || || || || 70–54 || L4
|- style="text-align:center; background:#cfc
| 125 || August 20 || @ Mets || || || || || || 71–54 || W1
|- style="text-align:center; background:#fbb
| 126 || August 21 || @ Mets || || || || || || 71–55 || L1
|- style="text-align:center; background:#cfc
| 127 || August 22 || @ Mets || || || || || || 72–55 || W1
|- style="text-align:center; background:#fbb
| 128 || August 24 || @ Phillies || || || || || || 72–56 || L1
|- style="text-align:center; background:#cfc
| 129 || August 25 || @ Phillies || || || || || || 73–56 || W1
|- style="text-align:center; background:#cfc
| 130 || August 26 || @ Phillies || || || || || || 74–56 || W2
|- style="text-align:center; background:#cfc
| 131 || August 27 || @ Expos || || || || || || 75–56 || W3
|- style="text-align:center; background:#fbb
| 132 || August 28 || @ Expos || || || || || || 75–57 || L1
|- style="text-align:center; background:#fbb
| 133 || August 29 || @ Expos || || || || || || 75–58 || L2
|- style="text-align:center; background:#cfc
| 134 || August 31 || Mets || || || || || || 76–58 || W1
|-

|- style="text-align:center; background:#cfc
| 135 || September 1 || Mets || || || || || || 77–58 || W2
|- style="text-align:center; background:#fbb
| 136 || September 2 || Mets || || || || || || 77–59 || L1
|- style="text-align:center; background:#fbb
| 137 || September 3 || Dodgers || || || || || || 77–60 || L2
|- style="text-align:center; background:#cfc
| 138 || September 4 || Dodgers || || || || || || 78–60 || W1
|- style="text-align:center; background:#cfc
| 139 || September 5 || Padres || || || || || || 79–60 || W2
|- style="text-align:center; background:#cfc
| 140 || September 6 || Padres || || || || || || 80–60 || W3
|- style="text-align:center; background:#fbb
| 141 || September 7 || Giants || || || || || || 80–61 || L1
|- style="text-align:center; background:#fbb
| 142 || September 8 || Giants || || || || || || 80–62 || L2
|- style="text-align:center; background:#cfc
| 143 || September 9 || Giants || || || || || || 81–62 || W1
|- style="text-align:center; background:#fbb
| 144 || September 11 || @ Reds || || || || || || 81–63 || L1
|- style="text-align:center; background:#fbb
| 145 || September 12 || @ Reds || || || || || || 81–64 || L2
|- style="text-align:center; background:#cfc
| 146 || September 14 || @ Giants || || || || || || 82–64 || W1
|- style="text-align:center; background:#fbb
| 147 || September 15 || @ Giants || || || || || || 82–65 || L1
|- style="text-align:center; background:#fbb
| 148 || September 16 || @ Giants || || || || || || 82–66 || L2
|- style="text-align:center; background:#cfc
| 149 || September 17 || @ Padres || || || || || || 83–66 || W1
|- style="text-align:center; background:#fbb
| 150 || September 18 || @ Padres || || || || || || 83–67 || L1
|- style="text-align:center; background:#fbb
| 151 || September 19 || Braves || || || || || || 83–68 || L2
|- style="text-align:center; background:#cfc
| 152 || September 20 || Braves || || || || || || 84–68 || W1
|- style="text-align:center; background:#cfc
| 153 || September 21 || Reds || || || || || || 85–68 || W2
|- style="text-align:center; background:#cfc
| 154 || September 22 || Reds || || || || || || 86–68 || W3
|- style="text-align:center; background:#fbb
| 155 || September 23 || Reds || || || || || || 86–69 || L1
|- style="text-align:center; background:#fbb
| 156 || September 24 || @ Braves || || || || || || 86–70 || L2
|- style="text-align:center; background:#fbb
| 157 || September 24 || @ Braves || || || || || || 86–71 || L3
|- style="text-align:center; background:#cfc
| 158 || September 25 || @ Braves || || || || || || 87–71 || W1
|- style="text-align:center; background:#fbb
| 159 || September 26 || @ Braves || || || || || || 87–72 || L1
|- style="text-align:center; background:#fbb
| 160 || September 28 || @ Dodgers || || || || || || 87–73 || L2
|- style="text-align:center; background:#cfc
| 161 || September 29 || @ Dodgers || || || || || || 88–73 || W1
|- style="text-align:center; background:#cfc
| 162 || September 30 || @ Dodgers || || || || || || 89–73 || W2
|-

|-
| Legend:       = Win       = Loss       = PostponementBold = Astros team member'

 Player stats 

 Batting 

 Starters by position Note: Pos = Position; G = Games played; AB = At bats; H = Hits; Avg. = Batting average; HR = Home runs; RBI = Runs batted in Other batters Note: G = Games played; AB = At bats; H = Hits; Avg. = Batting average; HR = Home runs; RBI = Runs batted in Pitching 

 Starting pitchers Note: G = Games pitched; IP = Innings pitched; W = Wins; L = Losses; ERA = Earned run average; SO = Strikeouts Other pitchers Note: G = Games pitched; IP = Innings pitched; W = Wins; L = Losses; ERA = Earned run average; SO = Strikeouts Relief pitchers Note: G = Games pitched; Innings pitched; W = Wins; L = Losses; SV = Saves; ERA = Earned run average; SO = Strikeouts''

Farm system 

LEAGUE CHAMPIONS: GCL Astros

References

External links
1979 Houston Astros season at Baseball Reference

Houston Astros seasons
Houston Astros season
Houston Astro